Ha Fa Shan is a village in Tsuen Wan District, Hong Kong.

Access
Ha Fa Shan is located along the Yuen Tsuen Ancient Trail.

External links
 Delineation of area of existing village Ha Fa Shan (Tsuen Wan) for election of resident representative (2019 to 2022)

Villages in Tsuen Wan District, Hong Kong